Langli station is a station on the Changsha Maglev Express. Trains stop here for 40 seconds to let passengers off and on.

History
Construction on the station began in July 2014. At that time, it was stated that it would open to passengers by the end of 2015. It actually opened on May 6, 2016. The station is the only intermediate stop on the Changsha Maglev Express line.

References

Railway stations in Hunan
Railway stations in China opened in 2016